Mintopola braziliensis is a moth of the subfamily Arctiinae. It was described by William Schaus in 1899. It is found in southern Brazil.

References

Lithosiini
Moths described in 1899